Millarworld Limited is a comic book company that was founded in 2004 by Scottish comic book writer Mark Millar as a creator-owned line. The imprint is best known for publishing the books Wanted, Chosen, The Unfunnies, Kick-Ass and War Heroes.

Licensing and adaptation
Wanted, published by Top Cow Productions, was loosely adapted into a feature film of the same name by Universal Pictures, released on 27 June 2008. Chosen, published by Dark Horse Comics, was described by Millar as a sequel to the Bible, and has been optioned by Sony Pictures. The Unfunnies was an anthropomorphic animal horror story published by Avatar Press. Kick-Ass, which was illustrated by John Romita Jr. and published by Marvel, was adapted into a film of the same name by Matthew Vaughn, and released in the United Kingdom on 26 March 2010 and the United States on 16 April.

In September 2008 it was announced that the yet unfinished War Heroes had been optioned by Sony Pictures Entertainment, with Michael De Luca as producer and Millar taking an executive producer role.

Millar has stated that whenever he sells the film adaptation rights to one of his creator-owned comics properties, he gives half of the money to the artist who illustrated the comics, despite his agent's reaction to this, saying, "Everything, all the money from the advance, the toys, the games, 50–50, so it's fair. I see it as a collaboration. If I drew, I could keep everything for myself, but I actually like the idea of having a talent that I'm not selling. One of my friends said, 'You could make even more money by drawing, too,' and I said, 'Yeah, and I suppose I could make even more money by lap dancing. It's nice to have something that's just for me."

History
In October 2014, following months of delays for Jupiter's Legacy #5, Millar stated that beginning in April 2015, all Millarworld series would be completely drawn before the publication of their debut issues, in order to maintain a monthly schedule.

On 7 August 2017, Millarworld was acquired by the American streaming media company Netflix.

The first comic book series that Millarworld published post acquisition was The Magic Order. The first issue was published on 13 June 2018.

On 17 July 2018 it was announced that Netflix had started work on the first set of films to be adapted from comics. These are: Empress, Huck and Sharkey the Bounty Hunter. The comic book series Jupiter's Legacy and American Jesus will be adapted as television series.

On 6 December 2018, Millar provided an update to the progress of the Millarworld properties adapted for Netflix. Jupiter's Legacy is going to be first television series released, with Steven S. DeKnight as the show runner, with American Jesus as the second television series released, with Everardo Gout and Leopoldo Gout as the show runners. Empress, Sharkey the Bounty Hunter and Huck are scheduled to be feature films in development. Under Netflix, Millar will exclusively adapt new Millarworld properties to the streaming service, with select properties having comic book tie-ins, starting with Prodigy.

On 11 March 2019, Netflix announced that it will produce an anime series based on Supercrooks. It will be produced by Bones, and is described as a "superpowered heist comic".

In late 2022, several updates on Millarworld production were given, including that Huck would be redeveloped as a TV series as opposed to a movie and that a live-action Supercrooks series would follow Jupiter's Legacy after the show was canceled after its first season. That same year it was announced that Millar would be launching four brand new comic series (Night Club, Nemesis Reloaded, The Magic Order 4 and The Ambassadors) and that they would lead into a crossover event entitled Big Game, which would be illistrated by Pepe Larraz and serve as a crossover between every Millarworld property.

Bibliography

References 

Netflix
Book publishing companies based in California
Comic book publishing companies of the United States
Comic book imprints
Companies based in West Hollywood, California
2004 in comics
American companies established in 2004
Publishing companies established in 2004
2017 mergers and acquisitions
American corporate subsidiaries
2004 establishments in California